"You Little Thief" is a song by Irish singer Feargal Sharkey, released in December 1985 as the second single from his self-titled debut album. It was written by Benmont Tench and produced by David A. Stewart. The song reached  5 in the United Kingdom and was a hit in several other countries, including Australia, Belgium, and Ireland.

A music video was filmed to promote the single. The B-side, "The Living Actor", was exclusive to the single. It was written by Anthony Moore and Sharkey, and produced by Sharkey. The extended version of "You Little Thief" was created by Sharkey.

Critical reception
On its release, Dave Henderson of Sounds was critical of the song, writing, "More hits for men with quiffs. Sure, it's crap, with a dreadful melody line and rhythm lifted from many a moon ago, but, what's new?"

Formats

Personnel
 Feargal Sharkey – lead vocals, producer of "The Living Actor", arranger
 David A. Stewart – producer and arranger on "You Little Thief", arranger on "The Living Actor"
 Shelly Yakus – mixing on "You Little Thief"
 David Rose – guitar on "The Living Actor"

Charts

Weekly charts

Year-end charts

References

1985 singles
1985 songs
Feargal Sharkey songs
Songs written by Benmont Tench
Virgin Records singles